Dimitra (before 1955: Τρουμπές - Troumpes) is a village and a community in the municipal unit of Vartholomio, Elis, Greece. It is situated in a rural plain, north of the river Pineios. It is 2 km northwest of Kardiakafti, 2 km east of Machos, 3 km southeast of Neochori and 3 km northeast of Vartholomio. Its population in 2011 was 296 for the village, and 324 for the community, which includes the small village Regklaiika. Between 1835 and 1912 Dimitra was part of the municipality of Myrtountia. Between 1912 and 1933 it was part of the community of Kardiakafti. Between 1933 and 1997, when it joined the municipality of Vartholomio, it was an independent community.

Population

See also
List of settlements in Elis

References

Populated places in Elis
Vartholomio